Wakatu (also spelt Whakatu, as in the  Māori name for the  Nelson area) is an industrial suburb of Nelson in New Zealand.

Parks

Wakatu has four local parks: Blackwood Reserve, Douglas Reserve, Highview Reserve and Norgate Reserve.

References

Suburbs of Nelson, New Zealand
Populated places in the Nelson Region